Jordan Jay Lawrence-Gabriel (born 25 September 1998) is an English professional footballer who plays for Blackpool, as a right back. He has previously played for Nottingham Forest and Scunthorpe United.

Club career

Nottingham Forest
Lawrence-Gabriel joined the Nottingham Forest academy from Southend United in February 2015. He signed professional terms with the club in January 2016.

On 24 September 2019, Lawrence-Gabriel made his professional debut when he appeared as an 81st-minute substitute during a 5–0 loss in an EFL Cup fixture against Arsenal. He trained with Port Vale in January 2020, though manager John Askey opted not to take the youngster on loan.

Lawrence-Gabriel was loaned to League Two club Scunthorpe United on 24 January 2020 on a deal until the end of the season.

On 12 September 2020, Lawrence-Gabriel made his league debut for Forest, playing the entirety of a 2-0 defeat against Queens Park Rangers.

On 1 October 2020, Lawrence-Gabriel signed an extension to his contract with Forest to keep him at the club until 2024. He was also subsequently loaned out for the remainder of the season to EFL League One side Blackpool. He scored his first goal on 28 November 2020 in a 4-0 win against Harrogate in the second round of the FA Cup.

Blackpool
On 31 August 2021, Lawrence-Gabriel returned to newly promoted Championship club Blackpool, having spent the previous season there on loan, joining for an undisclosed fee on a four-year deal.

International
In 2013, Lawrence-Gabriel was called up to the Scotland U16 squad, but remains uncapped at any international level.

Career statistics

Honours
Blackpool
EFL League One play-offs: 2021

References

External links
Jordan Lawrence-Gabriel's stats – Soccerbase

1998 births
Living people
Scottish footballers
Scotland youth international footballers
English footballers
English people of Scottish descent
Association football defenders
Nottingham Forest F.C. players
Scunthorpe United F.C. players
Blackpool F.C. players
English Football League players